Štefan Luby (born 6 May 1941, Bratislava) is a Slovak  physicist and senior research fellow at the Slovak Academy of Sciences (SAS). He is doctor honoris causa of University of Salento, Italy, Slovak University of Technology in Bratislava, University of Constantine the Philosopher in Nitra, Slovakia, and Alexander Dubček University in Trenčín, Slovakia. He occupied positions of the director of the Institute of Physics of SAS for nine years and was the president of the SAS for fourteen years (1995–2009). He was the acting president of the All European Academies (federation of European academies of sciences and arts) and the acting president of the Central European Academy of Sciences and Arts. At present, he is a member of Senate and vice-president of the European Academy of Sciences and Arts with the headquarters in Salzburg. He has chaired the editorial board of the Slovak Encyclopaedia Beliana since 1992.

His research field covers physics of semiconductors and metals, electronic devices, laser technology, X-ray optics, nanoscience and nanotechnology. He published more than 400 scientific papers, 8 patents and 10 books of non-fiction literature.

Biography
He spent his childhood in Liptovský Hrádok. He attended primary and secondary schools in Bratislava. He graduated at the Faculty of Electrotechnology of the Slovak University of Technology in Bratislava in 1963. He started his professional career at the Faculty of Natural Sciences of P. J. Šafárik University in Košice, Slovakia. In 1964 he joined the Slovak Academy of Sciences where he has been employed since then. He defended his DrSc. degree in 1982 and habilitated as the assistant professor at the Faculty of Mathematics and Physics of the Comenius University in Bratislava ten years later. In 1996 he obtained full professorship in physics at the Slovak University of Technology. He acts as a senior research fellow at the Institute of Physics of SAS. As the Humboldt fellow, he acted also as a visiting researcher or visiting professor at universities in Stuttgart and Bielefeld in Germany. He spent altogether four years at various foreign universities or research institutes (Germany, Italy, the United States, Japan, Greece and former Soviet Union).

Family
Father Prof. JUDr. Štefan Luby (1910), DrSc. (†1976) is one of the founders of the Slovak juridical sciences, mother JUDr. Anna Lubyová (†1989) was a lawyer, spouse Dipl. Ing. Želmíra Lubyová (†1996) was a researcher in chemistry, elder daughter JUDr. Mgr. Martina Lubyová, PhD.(*1967) is at present the Director of the Institute for Forecasting of SAS, before she was the Head of the branch of International Labour Office, Geneve, in Moscow, younger daughter Mgr. Barbora Lubyová, PhD. (*1968) is at present a researcher at the Institute of Immunology and Microbiology of the Academy of Sciences of the Czech Republic in Prague, before she performed her research at the Johns Hopkins University in Baltimore.

Awards, prizes

Crystal Wing Awards, Slovakia, 2001,
De scientia et humanitate optime meritis, Academy of Sciences, CR, 2001,
Cross of the President of SR, 2003,
Slovak state award Pribina Cross of the I. class, 2005,
Gold medal of SAS 2006,
Prize of the Club of Writers of Nonfiction Literature, 2006,
Identification Code of Slovakia, Artem, 2013,
Medals from Japan, Germany, etc.

Publications

Most important scientific papers

Distribution of copper and silicon in Al Cu Si magnetron sputtered deposits. In: Proc. 6th Internat. Symp. High Purity Materials in Science and Technology, Dresden, 1985, C 19, p. 205 206.

Non-fiction literature

My Intellectuals I, VEDA, Publ. House of SAS, Bratislava 2003, 143 p., in Slovak.
My Intellectuals II, VEDA, Publ. House of SAS, Bratislava 2004, 168p. , in Slovak.
Report from the Congress about Nothing, VEDA, Publ. House of SAS, Bratislava 2005, 157 s., in Slovak.
My Intellectuals III, VEDA, Publ. House of SAS, Bratislava 2006, 163 p., in Slovak.
Order vs. Chaos, VEDA, Publ. House of SAS, Bratislava 2008, 166 p., in Slovak.
Fascination by Nobel, VEDA, Publ. House of SAS, Bratislava 2009, 166 p., in Slovak.
Epigrams, Bon-mots and Maximas, illustr. by L. Hološka, VEDA, Publ. House of SAS, Bratislava 2011, 110 p., in Slovak.
Legends and Inspirations, VEDA, Publ. House of SAS, Bratislava 2011, 151 p., in Slovak.
Invectives and Insults, illustr. by L. Hološka, VEDA, Publ. House of SAS, Bratislava 2013, 128 p., in Slovak.
Sitting under Thousand Years Old Rosebush, with M. Lubyova, VEDA, Publ. House
of SAS,Bratislava 2014, 175 p., in Slovak.

References

External links
 Ing. Štefan Luby, DrSc., Dr.h.c.
 prof.Štefan Luby, DrSc.

Slovak physicists
Academic staff of the Slovak University of Technology in Bratislava
Scientists from Bratislava
1941 births
Living people